Carola Goya (1906–1994) was an American dancer, choreographer, and teacher who specialized in the study and performance of Spanish dance.  Her father, Samuel Weller, was an agent for New York-based actors.  Upon entering the professional dance world, Goya assumed a Spanish last name – her stage name later became her legal name.  She conducted her dance studies in New York and Madrid and performed professionally with the Metropolitan Opera Ballet as well as with the José Greco Dance Company.  In 1927, Goya made her first concert appearance as a Spanish dance soloist.

Goya is considered to be the first solo castanets performer.  In addition to performing solo, Goya performed with numerous symphony orchestras, such as the Detroit Symphony Orchestra and the Kansas City Philharmonic.  In 1954 she formed a dance partnership with American ethnic-dancer Matteo Vittucci.  The two were married in 1974.  Together they founded the Indo-American Dance Company (the company also performed under the names Foundation for Ethnic Dance and the Matteo Ethno-American Dance Theater).  Goya also served on the faculties of Connecticut College, Jacob’s Pillow, and the High School of Performing Arts in New York, among others.

References

External links 
New York Times Obituary: Carola Goya, 88, an Authority On Spanish Dance Forms, Dies, 1994
Archival footage of Carola Goya and Matteo performing at Jacob's Pillow in 1963

1906 births
1994 deaths
American female dancers
American choreographers
20th-century American dancers
20th-century American women